"Loyal Brave True" is a song recorded by American singer and songwriter Christina Aguilera, taken from the soundtrack to the 2020 action drama film Mulan. Co-written by Billy Crabtree, Harry Gregson-Williams, Jamie Hartman and Rosi Golan, the song was released as a single on March 6, 2020 by Walt Disney Records. "Loyal Brave True" received a nomination for the Soundtrack Song of 2020 at the 46th People's Choice Awards. It was also shortlisted as one of fifteen potential nominees for the Academy Award for Best Original Song.

Background and composition 
The song is a pop ballad, co-written by Billy Crabtree, Harry Gregson-Williams, Jamie Hartman and Rosi Golan. Hartman, who also produced "Loyal Brave True", has previously worked with Aguilera on her seventh studio album Lotus (2012), writing and co-producing a dance-pop song "Army of Me".
It was Mitchell Leib, the president of music and soundtracks for the Walt Disney Studios, who opted Aguilera for the project, as she already recorded a song for the 1998's Mulan. As Gregson-Williams disclosed, "From the demo to the final song, there was a massive leap in the intensity of the song, mainly due to the fact that Christina was going to sing it."

Hartman and Gregson-Williams incorporated classic Chinese musice influences in the song—one of the instruments used during the recording sessions was guzheng.

Critical reception 
In April 2020, Entertainment Focus named "Loyal Brave True" one of the best pop songs of the year so far. Entertainment Weekly editor Joey Nolfi praised Aguilera for her "powerhouse vocals", while Bianca Gracie of Billboard believed that the song is "filled with the undeniable warrior spirit we've all come to love Mulan for, but also updates the lead character's story for the 21st century". Bleeding Cool'''s Jeremy Konrad stated that Aguilera's strong voice "matches what is increasingly looking like an epic, powerful film". In December 2020, the Idolator editor Mike Wass named "Loyal Brave True" one of the best pop songs of the year, as well as one of the most underrated songs of the year. After the nominations for the 93rd Academy Awards were announced, Kory Grow of Rolling Stone wrote that the song was "surprisingly snubbed" for Best Original Song.

 Music videos 
Lyric videos for both "Loyal Brave True" and "El Mejor Guerrero" premiered on YouTube on March 6, 2020, along with the single. A short teaser of the music video for "Loyal Brave True" was publicized on August 13, and the next day the video was released in its full form. A Spanish-language video for "El Mejor Guerrero" premiered on YouTube's DisneyMusicVEVO channel simultaneously.

 Legacy 
In November 2021, Pamela Yuri covered the song on the tenth season of a reality talent show The Voice Brasil. The same year it was performed by Gabriela Marszał during the blind auditions of The Voice Kids Poland''.

Accolades

Credits and personnel 
Personnel

Credits adapted from Tidal.

Charts

Weekly charts

Year-end charts

References

External links
 

2020 singles
2020 songs
2020s ballads
Christina Aguilera songs
Pop ballads
Songs from Mulan (franchise)
Songs written by Jamie Hartman
Walt Disney Records singles
Songs written by Rosi Golan